Bacău railway station is the largest train station in the city of Bacău, Romania, and one of the most important in the north-east of the country.

References

External links

Bacău
Railway stations in Romania
Railway stations opened in 1872